Emilia Dafni (1881 – 1941) was a Greek writer.

The daughter of writer Ioannis Kourtelis and the goddaughter of Achilleus Paraschos, she married the poet Stefanos Thrasuboulos Zoiopoulos. She published a poetry collection Chrysanthemums in 1903. Besides poetry and novels, she also wrote several one-act plays and some short stories.

Selected works 
 Goblets of Gold, poetry (1923)
 The Gift of Smaro, novel (1924)
 Foreign Land, novel (1937)

Notes

References 

1881 births
1941 deaths
Greek women poets
Greek dramatists and playwrights
Greek women novelists